The University of Auckland's Faculty of Medical and Health Sciences (formerly known as The University of Auckland School of Medicine) was established in 1968 at its present site in Grafton, Auckland. Prior to this, the University of Otago had taught some students from the final years of its medical course in Auckland through a branch faculty of the Dunedin School of Medicine.

Research

The Faculty possesses the only brain bank in New Zealand. This brain bank contains over 400 brains bequeathed to the medical school,. These include brains donated by people who died with neurological diseases such as Huntington's disease and Parkinson's disease.

The University of Auckland welcomed the commitment by New Zealand and Australian prime ministers to fund NZ $3 million over 2 years for a trans-Tasman project to investigate potential vaccines against Rheumatic fever

Rheumatic fever is a major health concern in NZ and Australia, particularly in Maori, Pacifica and Aboriginal communities, which have the highest rates in the world. It is a result of an immune reaction to infection by group A streptococcus. This vaccine project complements ongoing public health programs which contribute to high rates of disease in New Zealand and Australia. The University has considerable expertise in both the basic science of group A streptococcus infection and public health approaches required to take high rates of rheumatic fever as per John Fraser, Dean of the Faculty of Medical and Health sciences.

References

External links
 Faculty of Medical and Health Sciences website
 Waikato Clinical School
 AUMSA site
 New Zealand Medical Students' Association website

Medical and Health Sciences, Faculty of, University of Auckland
A, University of Auckland